Scotch Bush may refer to:

 Scotch Bush, Hastings County, Ontario
 Scotch Bush, Renfrew County, Ontario